Sant Pere del Burgal is a Romanesque Benedictine monastery in Escaló, in the municipality of La Guingueta d'Àneu, Pallars Sobirà, Catalonia, Spain. The monastery was first mentioned in a precept of Count Raymond of Toulouse in 859. It later became a priory of the abbey of Roussillon. It fell into decline and was secularized in 1570 and confiscated in 1835. It contains frescoes dated to the 11th century.

References

External links
 Monestir de Sant Pere del Burgal - Monestirs de Catalunya 

Benedictine monasteries in Catalonia
Romanesque architecture in Catalonia